Northern Kentucky TC Stars were a W-League club based in Wilder, Kentucky, USA. The team folded after the 2003 season.

Year-by-year

Women's soccer clubs in the United States
Defunct soccer clubs in Kentucky
Defunct USL W-League (1995–2015) teams
Women's sports in Kentucky
2003 disestablishments in Kentucky
Association football clubs disestablished in 2003